James Mackay may refer to:
James Mackay (British Army officer) (1718–1785), captain in the British Army during the French and Indian War
James Mackay (New Zealand politician, born 1804) (1804–1875), New Zealand MP
James Mackay (New Zealand politician, born 1831) (1831–1912), New Zealand farmer, explorer and member of the Auckland Provincial Council
Kenneth Mackay (Australian politician) (James Alexander Kenneth Mackay, 1859–1935), Australian politician, writer and military leader
James Mackay, 1st Earl of Inchcape (1852–1932), British colonial administrator
James Mackay (cricketer) (1880–1953), Australian cricketer
James Mackay (rugby union) (1905–1985), New Zealand rugby union player
James MacKay (American politician) (1919–2004), U.S., Representative from Georgia
James Mackay, Baron Mackay of Clashfern (born 1927), Scottish lawyer and former Lord Chancellor
James A. Mackay (1936–2007), Scottish historian and philatelist
James Mackay (police officer), retired Deputy Chief Constable of Tayside police
James Mackay (film producer) (born 1954), friend and collaborator of Derek Jarman
James Mackay (actor) (born 1984), Australian actor
James Townsend Mackay (1775–1862), Scottish botanist who lived in Ireland
Jim "Bones" Mackay, golf caddy for Phil Mickelson
Jimmy Mackay (1943–1998), Australian footballer

James MacKay
James McKay (disambiguation)
James Mackey (disambiguation)
James Mackie (disambiguation)